Christoph Längle (born 20 October 1979) is an Austrian politician who has been a Member of the Federal Council. He has been appointed by the state parliament of Vorarlberg (Vorarlberger Landtag) as a member of the Federal Council for the Freedom Party of Austria (FPÖ) in 2014. In May 2019 he left the Freedom Party and served as an independent member of the Federal Council since then.

References

1979 births
Living people
Members of the Federal Council (Austria)
Freedom Party of Austria politicians